Abdulsamed Akin (born July 17, 1991) is a Turkish-German footballer who plays for Sportfreunde Schwäbisch Hall.

External links

1991 births
Living people
German people of Turkish descent
German footballers
Stuttgarter Kickers II players
Stuttgarter Kickers players
3. Liga players
Association football midfielders
1. FC Normannia Gmünd players
VfL Kirchheim/Teck players
Footballers from Stuttgart